Pleomorphic lipomas, like spindle-cell lipomas, occur for the most part on the backs and necks of elderly men, and are characterized by floret giant cells with overlapping nuclei.

See also
Lipoma
Skin lesion
List of cutaneous conditions

References

External links 

 

Dermal and subcutaneous growths